Juan Ramon Schaeffer (born 13 October 1982) is a Guatemalan sport shooter. In 2019, he won the silver medal in the men's skeet event at the 2019 Pan American Games held in Lima, Peru.

In 2015, he competed in the men's skeet event at the 2015 Pan American Games without winning a medal. He did not advance to the semi-final and he was eliminated in the qualification round.

He represented Guatemala at the 2020 Summer Olympics in Tokyo, Japan. He competed in the men's skeet event.

References

External links 
 

Living people
1982 births
Place of birth missing (living people)
Guatemalan male sport shooters
Skeet shooters
Pan American Games medalists in shooting
Pan American Games silver medalists for Guatemala
Shooters at the 2015 Pan American Games
Shooters at the 2019 Pan American Games
Medalists at the 2019 Pan American Games
Shooters at the 2020 Summer Olympics
Olympic shooters of Guatemala